Never Never may refer to 

 Never Never (Australian outback), a colloquial name for the Australian outback
 Never Never, a 2002 short film directed by Jordan Scott
 a colloquial term for hire purchase

songs
 "Never Never" by Letty Katts, aka "Riding to the Never Never"
 "Never Never" (Korn song), 2013 single released by Korn
 "Never Never" (The Assembly song), the only single released by The Assembly
 "Never Never", a 2007 song by reggaefusion group Brick & Lace from the album Love Is Wicked
 "Never Never", single by Warm Jets from the album Future Signs
 "Never Never", single by Indiiana with Drenchill

novels
 Never Never, a 2008 novel by David Gaffney
 We of the Never Never, an autobiographical novel by Jeannie Gunn

See also
 Never Ever (disambiguation)
 Never Never Never